The Kotaneelee River is a river in the Northwest Territories of Canada. It is a tributary of the Liard River.

It gives the name to the Kotaneelee Formation, a stratigraphical unit of the Western Canadian Sedimentary Basin.

Course
It flows west into the Northwest Territories, then south-east between the La Biche Range and the Northern Kotaneelee Range. It turns again eastwards and separates the Northern and Southern Kotaneelee Ranges. After receiving the waters of the Chinkeh Creek, it turns south and flows parallel and to the west of the Liard Range of the Franklin Mountains.

Tributaries
Chinkeh Creek - left tributary

See also
List of rivers of the Northwest Territories

References

Rivers of the Northwest Territories
Rivers of Yukon